Alexander Gordon Patrick (13 June 1914 – 19 March 2014) was a New Zealand track cyclist who represented his country at the 1938 British Empire Games.

Early life and family
Born in the Auckland suburb of Mount Eden on 13 June 1914, Patrick was the son of Andrew Taylor Patrick and Ethel Mary Patrick (née Triner). Through his mother, he was a first cousin of Ronald Triner, who also represented New Zealand as a cyclist at the 1938 British Empire Games.

Cycling
A member of the Manuaku Amateur Cycling Club, Patrick was third, behind Ron Ulmer and Frank Grose, in the paced 10-mile race at the New Zealand cycling championships in 1935. He went on to win the same event at the national championships in 1937, recording a time of 20:33.

At the 1938 British Empire Games in Sydney, Patrick competed in the 10-mile scratch race but was unplaced.

Military service
During World War II, Patrick served as a corporal in the Royal New Zealand Air Force.

Sailing
Patrick was an accomplished sailor of the Mistral class of two-handed dinghy, originally designed by Des Townson in 1959, and was a life member of the New Zealand Mistral Owners' Association. He also used his skills as a woodwork teacher to build wooden Mistrals.

Death
Patrick died in Pakuranga on 19 March 2014, aged 99 years.

References 

1914 births
2014 deaths
Cyclists from Auckland
New Zealand male cyclists
Commonwealth Games competitors for New Zealand
Cyclists at the 1938 British Empire Games
New Zealand military personnel of World War II
Royal New Zealand Air Force personnel
New Zealand male sailors (sport)
New Zealand boat builders
20th-century New Zealand people